The 2012 edition of the Canadian Polaris Music Prize was presented on September 24, 2012  at Toronto's Masonic Temple.

The award was won by Feist for her album Metals.

Shortlist
The 10-album shortlist was revealed on July 17, 2012.

Longlist

The prize's preliminary 40-album longlist was announced on June 14 at The Waldorf Hotel in Vancouver.

References

External links
 Polaris Music Prize

2012 in Canadian music
2012 music awards
2012